Giovanni D'Amato was a Roman Catholic prelate who served as Bishop of Minori (1565–1567).

Biography
On 12 October 1565, Giovanni D'Amato was appointed during the papacy of Pope Pius IV as Bishop of Minori.
On 21 October 1565, he was consecrated bishop by Giovanni Antonio Serbelloni, Bishop of Novara, with Antonio Elio, Titular Patriarch of Jerusalem, and Ascanio Albertini, Bishop of Avellino e Frigento, serving as co-consecrators. 
He served as Bishop of Minori until his resignation in 1567.

Episcopal succession
While bishop, he was the principal co-consecrator of:
Felice Peretti Montalto, Bishop of Sant'Agata de' Goti (1567); 
Gaspare Visconti, Archbishop of Milan (1584); 
Francesco Liparuli, (Liparolo), Bishop of Capri (1584); 
Cesare Speciano, (Speciani), Bishop of Novara (1584); and
Fulvio Passerini, Bishop of Avellino e Frigento (1591).

References

External links and additional sources
 (for Chronology of Bishops) 
 (for Chronology of Bishops) 

16th-century Italian Roman Catholic bishops
Bishops appointed by Pope Pius IV